Kabaka is the title of the king of the Kingdom of Buganda. According to the traditions of the Baganda they are ruled by two kings, one spiritual and the other secular.

The spiritual, or supernatural, king is represented by the Royal Drums, regalia called Mujaguzo and, as they always exist, the Buganda at any time will always have a king. Mujaguzo, like any other king, has his own palace, officials, servants and palace guards. The material, human prince has to perform special cultural rites on the Royal Drums before he can be declared king of Buganda. Upon the birth of a royal prince or princess, the Royal Drums are sounded by drummers specially selected from a specified clan as a means of informing the subjects of the kingdom of the birth of a new member of the royal family. The same Royal Drums are sounded upon the death of a reigning king to officially announce the death of the material king. According to Buganda culture, a king does not die but gets lost in the forest. Inside Buganda's royal tombs such as the Kasubi Tombs and the Wamala Tombs, one is shown the entrance of the forest. It is a taboo to look beyond the entrance.

Additionally, there is another specific tradition of the Baganda concerning the two kings who rule the Kingdom of Buganda that began after the death of Kabaka Tebandeke (c. 1704 – c.1724). When Kabaka Tebandeke died, he was succeeded by two kings of Buganda; the first was his cousin Kabaka Ndawula Nsobya (c. 1724–c. 1734) who became the material king and the second was his only surviving biological son Juma Katebe who became the spiritual king. Juma Katebe (sometimes spelt Juma Kateebe) held the spiritual priesthood which was originally part of the throne of the Kabaka. Since the death of Kabaka Tebandeke, the two lines of kings have been in perpetual succession to date. Juma Katebe is king over the spirits or the spiritual forces of the Buganda kingdom. The current reigning spiritual king is also named "Juma Katebe" after the name of the historical only surviving biological son of Kabaka Tebandeke who was named Juma Katebe. When the coronation of the material king is done, the coronation of the spiritual king (Juma Katebe) is also done. The Juma Katebe, the spiritual king, is involved in the traditional procedures to crown the new material king after the death of a reigning material king. The Juma Katebe’s spiritual power originates from Kabaka Tebandeke. The Juma Katebe regularly visits the "masiro" or palace tomb or burial ground of Kabaka Tebandeke located in Bundeke, Merera in Busiro (part of Wakiso district of Uganda) to perform special religious ceremonies.

Election of kings 
Buganda has no concept equivalent to the Crown Prince. All the princes are equally treated prior to the coronation of a new king following the death of a reigning monarch. However, during the period of a reigning king, a special council has the mandate to study the behavior and characteristics of the young princes. The reigning king, informed by the recommendation of the special council, selects one prince to be his successor. In a secret ceremony, the selected prince is given a special piece of bark cloth by the head of the special verification council. The name of the "king-to-be" is kept secret by the special council until the death of the reigning king. When all the princes and princesses are called to view the body of the late king lying in state, the selected prince lays the special piece of bark cloth over the body of the late king, revealing himself as the successor to the throne.

By tradition, Baganda children take on the clan of their biological fathers. It is a common misconception that the Kabaka (king) of Buganda takes his clan from his mother. Some go as far as saying that Buganda's royal family was matrilineal. Neither of these assertions is true.
The Kabaka has his own clan which is called the royal clan "Olulyo Olulangira". Members of this clan are referred to as abalangira for males and abambejja for females. The misconception arose in part because the royal clan has no totem which is something that all other Baganda clans have. However, the totem should not be confused with the clan. The totem is just a symbol but the clan is a matter of genealogy. The royal clan has its own genealogy traced along the patrilineal line, extending all the way back to Kintu.

The firstborn prince, by tradition called Kiweewa, is not allowed to become king. That was carefully planned to protect him against any attempted assassinations in a bid to fight for the crown. Instead, he is given special roles to play in the matters of the royal family and kingdom. Thus, the name of the possible successor to the throne remains secret.

Kings of Buganda 

The following are the known Kings of Buganda, starting from around 1300 AD.

 Kato Kintu, early fourteenth century
 Chwa I, mid fourteenth century
 Kimera,  1374– 1404
 Ttembo,  1404– 1434
 Kiggala,  1434– 1464 and  1484– 1494
 Kiyimba,  1464– 1484
 Kayima,  1494– 1524
 Nakibinge,  1524– 1554 a period of Interregnum,  1554– 1555
 Mulondo,  1555–1564
 Jemba,  1564– 1584
 Suuna I,  1584– 1614
 Sekamaanya,  1614– 1634
 Kimbugwe,  1634– 1644
 Kateregga,  1644– 1674
 Mutebi I,  1674– 1680
 Juuko,  1680– 1690
 Kayemba,  1690– 1704
 Tebandeke,  1704– 1724
 Ndawula,  1724– 1734
 Kagulu,  1734– 1736
 Kikulwe,  1736– 1738
 Mawanda,  1738– 1740
 Ndugwa I,  1740– 1741
 Namuggala,  1741– 1750
 Kyabaggu,  1750– 1780
 Jjunju,  1780– 1797
 Semakookiro,  1797– 1814
 Kamaanya, 1814–1832
 Suuna II, 1832–1856
 Muteesa I, 1856–1884
 Mwanga II, 1884–1888 and 1889–1897
 Kiweewa, 1888
 Kalema, 1888–1889
 Daudi Chwa II, 1897–1939
 Mutesa II, 1939–1969 Monarchy discontinued by the Ugandan government, 1969–1993
 Muwenda Mutebi II, 1993–present

Quotes 
"The Kiganda Monarchy in its purest form ended with Suuna; under Mutesa I, it was scorched; and under Mwanga it was destroyed."
 G.N. Uzoigwe, Britain and the Conquest of Africa, 1974

"Whatever else divided the Baganda; they were united under the institution of Kabaka and derived their pride from service to the Kabaka and nation."
 Samwiri Lwanga Lunyiigo, Mwanga II, 2011

See also 

 History of Buganda

Further reading 

Apter, D. E. (2013). The Political Kingdom in Uganda: A Study in Bureaucratic Nationalism. Routledge.
Ashe, R. P. (1889). Two Kings of Uganda: Or, Life by the Shores of Victoria Nyanza. S. Low, Marston, Searle, & Rivington.
Kaggwa, Sir Apollo K, Basekabaka be’Buganda [translated by MM Semakula Kiwanuka]. Nairobi: East African Publishing House, 1971.
Kiwanuka, MM Semakula, Muteesa of Uganda. Kampala: East African Literature Bureau, 1967.
Kiwanuka, MM Semakula, A History of Buganda: From the foundation of the Kingdom to 1900. London: Longman, 1971.
Low, D. A. (1971). The Mind of Buganda: documents of the modern history of an African kingdom. Univ of California Press.
Roscoe, J. (1911). The Baganda: An account of their native customs and beliefs. Macmillan.

References

External links 

 The official Buganda kingdom website
 Tombs for Kabaka Ssuuna

Titles of national or ethnic leadership
Royal titles
Buganda
14th-century establishments in Africa
Ugandan monarchies